8 (eight) is the natural number following 7 and preceding 9.

Etymology 
English eight, from Old English , æhta, Proto-Germanic *ahto is a direct continuation of Proto-Indo-European *oḱtṓ(w)-, and as such cognate with Greek  and Latin octo-, both of which stems are reflected by the English prefix oct(o)-, as in the ordinal adjective octaval or octavary, the distributive adjective is octonary.
The adjective octuple (Latin octu-plus) may also be used as a noun, meaning "a set of eight items"; the diminutive octuplet is mostly used to refer to eight siblings delivered in one birth.

The Semitic numeral is based on a root *θmn-, whence Akkadian smn-, Arabic ṯmn-, Hebrew šmn- etc.

The Chinese numeral, written  (Mandarin: bā; Cantonese: baat), is from Old Chinese *priāt-, ultimately from Sino-Tibetan b-r-gyat or b-g-ryat which also yielded Tibetan brgyat.

It has been argued that, as the cardinal number  is the highest number of items that can universally be cognitively processed as a single set, the etymology of the numeral eight might be the first to be considered composite, either as "twice four" or as "two short of ten", or similar.
The Turkic words for "eight" are from a Proto-Turkic stem *sekiz, which has been suggested as originating as a negation of eki "two", as in "without two fingers" (i.e., "two short of ten; two fingers are not being held up");
this same principle is found in Finnic *kakte-ksa, which conveys a meaning of "two before (ten)". The Proto-Indo-European reconstruction *oḱtṓ(w)- itself has been argued as representing an old dual, which would correspond to an original meaning of "twice four".
Proponents of this "quaternary hypothesis" adduce the numeral , which might be built on the stem new-, meaning "new" (indicating the beginning of a "new set of numerals" after having counted to eight).

Evolution of the Arabic digit 

The modern digit 8, like all modern Arabic numerals other than zero, originates with the Brahmi numerals.
The Brahmi digit for eight by the 1st century was written in one stroke as a curve └┐ looking like an uppercase H with the bottom half of the left line and the upper half of the right line removed.
However, the digit for eight used in India in the early centuries of the Common Era developed considerable graphic variation, and in some cases took the shape of a single wedge, which was adopted into the Perso-Arabic tradition as ٨ (and also gave rise to the later Devanagari form ८); the alternative curved glyph also existed as a variant in Perso-Arabic tradition, where it came to look similar to our digit 5.

The digits as used in Al-Andalus by the 10th century were a distinctive western variant of the glyphs used in the Arabic-speaking world, known as ghubār numerals (ghubār translating to "sand table"). In these digits, the line of the 5-like glyph used in Indian manuscripts for eight came to be formed in ghubār as a closed loop, which was the 8-shape that became adopted into European use in the 10th century.

The infinity symbol ∞, described as a "sideways figure eight", is unrelated to the digit 8 in origin; it is first used (in the mathematical meaning "infinity") in the 17th century, and it may be derived from the Roman numeral for "one thousand" CIƆ, or alternatively from the final Greek letter, ω.

In mathematics 
It is the third power of two, being 2 (or two cubed), and the first number of the form ,  being an integer greater than 1. 

 8 is the first number which is neither prime nor semiprime and the only nonzero perfect power that is one less than another perfect power, by Mihăilescu's Theorem. 
 8 is a Fibonacci number, being  plus . It is the only positive Fibonacci number, aside from 1, that is a perfect cube.
 8 is the first number to be the aliquot sum of two numbers: the discrete biprime , and the square number .

Sphenic numbers always have exactly eight divisors.

A polygon with eight sides is an octagon. With a central angle of 45 degrees and an internal angle of 135 degrees, a regular octagon can fill a plane-vertex with a regular triangle and a regular icositetragon, as well as tessellate two-dimensional space alongside squares in the truncated square tiling. This tiling is one of eight Archimedean tilings that are semi-regular, or made of more than one type of regular polygon, and the only tiling that can admit a regular octagon. The Ammann–Beenker tiling is a nonperiodic tesselation of prototiles that feature prominent octagonal silver eightfold symmetry, that is the two-dimensional orthographic projection of the four-dimensional 8-8 duoprism. In number theory, figurate numbers representing octagons are called octagonal numbers.

A cube is a regular polyhedron with eight vertices that also forms the cubic honeycomb, the only regular honeycomb in three-dimensional space. Through various truncation operations, the cubic honeycomb generates eight other convex uniform honeycombs under the cubic group . The octahedron, with eight equilateral triangles as faces, is the dual polyhedron to the cube and one of eight convex deltahedra. The stella octangula, or eight-pointed star, is the only stellation with octahedral symmetry. It has eight triangular faces alongside eight vertices that forms a cubic faceting, composed of two self-dual tetrahedra that makes it the simplest of five regular compounds. The cuboctahedron, on the other hand, is a rectified cube or rectified octahedron, and one of only two convex quasiregular polyhedra. It contains eight equilateral triangular faces, whose first stellation is the cube-octahedron compound. There are also eight uniform polyhedron compounds made purely of octahedra, including the regular compound of five  octahedra, and an infinite amount of polyhedron compounds made only of octahedra as triangular antiprisms (UC22 and UC23, with p = 3 and q = 1). 
 
The truncated tetrahedron is the simplest Archimedean solid, made of four triangles and four hexagons, the hexagonal prism, which classifies as an irregular octahedron and parallelohedron, is able to tessellate space as a three-dimensional analogue of the hexagon, and the gyrobifastigium, with four square faces and four triangular faces, is the only Johnson solid that is able to tessellate space. The truncated octahedron, also a parallelohedron, is the permutohedron of order four, with eight hexagonal faces alongside six squares is likewise the only Archimedean solid that can generate a honeycomb on its own. 

A tesseract or 8-cell is the four-dimensional analogue of the cube. It is one of six regular polychora, with a total of eight cubical cells, hence its name. Its dual figure is the analogue of the octahedron, with twice the amount of cells  and simply termed the 16-cell, that is the orthonormal basis of vectors in four dimensions. Whereas a tesseractic honeycomb is self-dual, a 16-cell honeycomb is dual to a 24-cell honeycomb that is made of 24-cells. The 24-cell is also regular, and made purely of octahedra whose vertex arrangement represents the ring of Hurwitz integral quaternions. Both the tesseract and the 16-cell can fit inside a 24-cell, and in a 24-cell honeycomb, eight 24-cells meet at a vertex. Also, the Petrie polygon of the tesseract and the 16-cell is a regular octagon.

Vertex-transitive semiregular polytopes whose facets are finite exist up through the 8th dimension. In the third dimension, they include the Archimedean solids and the infinite family of uniform prisms and antiprisms, while in the fourth dimension, only the rectified 5-cell, the rectified 600-cell, and the snub 24-cell are semiregular polytopes. For dimensions five through eight, the demipenteract and the k21 polytopes 221, 321, and 421 are the only semiregular (Gosset) polytopes. Collectively, the k21 family of polytopes contains eight figures that are rooted in the triangular prism, which is the simplest semiregular polytope that is made of three cubes and two equilateral triangles. It also includes one of only three semiregular Euclidean honeycombs: the affine 521 honeycomb that represents the arrangement of vertices of the eight-dimensional  lattice, and made of 421 facets. The culminating figure is the ninth-dimensional 621 honeycomb, which is the only affine semiregular paracompact hyperbolic honeycomb with infinite facets and vertex figures in the k21 family. There are no other finite semiregular polytopes or honeycombs in dimensions n > 8.

The octonions are a hypercomplex normed division algebra that are an extension of the complex numbers. They are realized in eight dimensions, where they have an isotopy group over the real numbers that is spin group Spin(8), the unique such group that exhibits a phenomenon of triality. As a double cover of special orthogonal group SO(8), Spin(8) contains the special orthogonal Lie algebra D4 as its Dynkin diagram, whose order-three outer automorphism is isomorphic to the symmetric group S3, giving rise to its triality. Over finite fields, the eight-dimensional Steinberg group 3D4(q3) is simple, and one of sixteen such groups in the classification of finite simple groups. As is  Lie algebra E8, whose complex form in 248 dimensions is the largest of five exceptional Lie algebras that include E7 and E6, which are held inside E8. The smallest such algebra is G2, that is the automorphism group of the octonions. In mathematical physics, special unitary group SO(3) has an eight-dimensional adjoint representation whose colors are ascribed gauge symmetries that represent the vectors of the eight gluons in the Standard Model.

The  lattice Γ8 is the smallest positive even unimodular lattice. As a lattice, it holds the optimal structure for the densest packing of 240 spheres in eight dimensions, whose lattice points also represent the root system of Lie group E8. This honeycomb arrangement is shared by a unique complex tessellation of Witting polytopes, also with 240 vertices. Each complex Witting polytope is made of Hessian polyhedral cells that have Möbius–Kantor polygons as faces, each with eight vertices and eight complex equilateral triangles as edges, whose Petrie polygons form regular octagons. In general, positive even unimodular lattices only exist in dimensions proportional to eight. In the 16th dimension, there are two such lattices : Γ8 ⊕ Γ8 and Γ16, while in the 24th dimension there are precisely twenty-four such lattices that are called the Niemeier lattices, the most important being the Leech lattice, which can be constructed using the octonions as well as with three copies of the ring of icosians that are isomorphic to the  lattice. The order of the smallest non-abelian group all of whose subgroups are normal is 8.

The number 8 is involved with a number of interesting mathematical phenomena related to the notion of Bott periodicity. If  is the direct limit of the inclusions of real orthogonal groups , the following holds:

.

Clifford algebras also display a periodicity of 8. For example, the algebra Cl(p + 8,q) is isomorphic to the algebra of 16 by 16 matrices with entries in Cl(p,q). We also see a period of 8 in the K-theory of spheres and in the representation theory of the rotation groups, the latter giving rise to the 8 by 8 spinorial chessboard. All of these properties are closely related to the properties of the octonions, which occupy the highest possible dimension for a normed division algebra.

List of basic calculations

In other bases 
A number is divisible by 8 if its last three digits, when written in decimal, are also divisible by 8, or its last three digits are 0 when written in binary.

8 is the base of the octal number system, which is mostly used with computers. In octal, one digit represents three bits. In modern computers, a byte is a grouping of eight bits, also called an octet.

In science

Physics 
 In nuclear physics, the second magic number.
 In particle physics, the eightfold way is used to classify sub-atomic particles.
 In statistical mechanics, the eight-vertex model has 8 possible configurations of arrows at each vertex.

Astronomy 
 Messier object M8, a magnitude 5.0 nebula in the constellation of Sagittarius.
 The New General Catalogue object NGC 8, a double star in the constellation Pegasus.
 Since the demotion of Pluto to a dwarf planet on 24 August 2006, in our Solar System, eight of the bodies orbiting the Sun are considered to be planets.

Chemistry 
 The atomic number of oxygen.
 The most stable allotrope of a sulfur molecule is made of eight sulfur atoms arranged in a rhombic form.
 The maximum number of electrons that can occupy a valence shell.
 The red pigment lycopene consists of eight isoprene units.

Geology 
 A disphenoid crystal is bounded by eight scalene triangles arranged in pairs. A ditetragonal prism in the tetragonal crystal system has eight similar faces whose alternate interfacial angles only are equal.

Biology 
 All spiders, and more generally all arachnids, have eight legs. Orb-weaver spiders of the cosmopolitan family Areneidae have eight similar eyes.
 The octopus and its cephalopod relatives in genus Argonauta have eight arms (tentacles).
 Compound coelenterates of the subclass or order Alcyonaria have polyps with eight-branched tentacles and eight septa.
 Sea anemones of genus Edwardsia have eight mesenteries.
 Animals of phylum Ctenophora swim by means of eight meridional bands of transverse ciliated plates, each plate representing a row of large modified cilia.
 The eight-spotted forester (genus Alypia, family Zygaenidae) is a diurnal moth having black wings with brilliant white spots.
 The ascus in fungi of the class Ascomycetes, following nuclear fusion, bears within it typically eight ascospores.
 Herbs of genus Coreopsis (tickseed) have showy flower heads with involucral bracts in two distinct series of eight each.
 In human adult dentition there are eight teeth in each quadrant. The eighth tooth is the so-called wisdom tooth.
 There are eight cervical nerves on each side in man and most mammals.

Psychology 

 There are eight Jungian cognitive functions, according to the MBTI models by John Beebe and Linda Berens.
 Timothy Leary identified a hierarchy of eight levels of consciousness.

In technology 

 A byte is eight bits.
 Many (mostly historic) computer architectures are eight-bit, among them the Nintendo Entertainment System.
 Standard-8 and Super-8 are 8 mm film formats.
 Video8, Hi8 and Digital8 are related 8 mm video formats.
 On most phones, the 8 key is associated with the letters T, U, and V, but on the BlackBerry Pearl it is the key for B and N.
 An eight may refer to an eight-cylinder engine or automobile. A V8 engine is an internal combustion engine with eight cylinders configured in two banks (rows) of four forming a "V" when seen from the end.
 A figure-eight knot (so named for its configuration) is a kind of stopper knot.
 The number eight written in parentheses is the code for the musical note in Windows Live Messenger.
 In a seven-segment display, when an 8 is illuminated, all the display bulbs are on.

In measurement 
 The SI prefix for 10008 is yotta (Y), and for its reciprocal, yocto (y).
 In liquid measurement (United States customary units), there are eight fluid ounces in a cup, eight pints in a gallon and eight tablespoonfuls in a gill.
 There are eight furlongs in a mile.
 The clove, an old English unit of weight, was equal to eight pounds when measuring cheese.
 An eight may be an article of clothing of the eighth size.
 Force eight is the first wind strength attributed to a gale on the Beaufort scale when announced on a Shipping Forecast.

In culture

Currency 

 Sailors and civilians alike from the 1500s onward referred to evenly divided parts of the Spanish dollar as "pieces of eight", or "bits".

Architecture 

 Various types of buildings are usually eight-sided (octagonal), such as single-roomed gazebos and multi-roomed pagodas (descended from stupas; see religion section below).
 Eight caulicoles rise out of the leafage in a Corinthian capital, ending in leaves that support the volutes.

In religion, folk belief and divination

Hinduism 
 Also known as Ashtha, Aṣṭa, or Ashta in Sanskrit, it is the number of wealth and abundance.
 The goddess of wealth and prosperity, Lakshmi, has eight forms known as Ashta Lakshmi and worshipped as: "Maha-lakshmi, Dhana-lakshmi, Dhanya-lakshmi, Gaja-lakshmi,Santana-lakshmi, Veera-lakshmi, Vijaya-lakshmi and Vidhya-lakshmi"
There are eight nidhi, or seats of wealth, according to Hinduism.
There are eight guardians of the directions known as Astha-dikpalas.
There are eight Hindu monasteries established by the saint Madhvacharya in Udupi, India popularly known as the Ashta Mathas of Udupi.

Buddhism 

 The Dharmacakra, a Buddhist symbol, has eight spokes. The Buddha's principal teaching—the Four Noble Truths—ramifies as the Noble Eightfold Path and the Buddha emphasizes the importance of the eight attainments or jhanas.
 In Mahayana Buddhism, the branches of the Eightfold Path are embodied by the Eight Great Bodhisattvas: (Manjusri, Vajrapani, Avalokiteśvara, Maitreya, Ksitigarbha, Nivaranavishkambhi, Akasagarbha, and Samantabhadra). These are later (controversially) associated with the Eight Consciousnesses according to the Yogacara school of thought: consciousness in the five senses, thought-consciousness, self-consciousness, and unconsciousness-"consciousness" or "store-house consciousness" (alaya-vijñana). The "irreversible" state of enlightenment, at which point a Bodhisattva goes on "autopilot", is the Eight Ground or bhūmi. In general, "eight" seems to be an auspicious number for Buddhists, e.g., the "eight auspicious symbols" (the jewel-encrusted parasol; the goldfish (always shown as a pair, e.g., the glyph of Pisces); the self-replenishing amphora; the white kamala lotus-flower; the white conch; the eternal (Celtic-style, infinitely looping) knot; the banner of imperial victory; the eight-spoked wheel that guides the ship of state, or that symbolizes the Buddha's teaching). Similarly, Buddha's birthday falls on the 8th day of the 4th month of the Chinese calendar.

Judaism 
 The religious rite of brit milah (commonly known as circumcision) is held on a baby boy's eighth day of life.
 Hanukkah is an eight-day Jewish holiday that starts on the 25th day of Kislev.
 Shemini Atzeret (Hebrew: "Eighth Day of Assembly") is a one-day Jewish holiday immediately following the seven-day holiday of Sukkot.

Christianity 
 The spiritual Eighth Day, because the number 7 refers to the days of the week (which repeat themselves).
 The number of Beatitudes.
 1 Peter 3:20 states that there were eight people on Noah's Ark.
 The Antichrist is the eighth king in the Book of Revelation.

Islam 
 In Islam, eight is the number of angels carrying the throne of Allah in heaven.
 The number of gates of heaven

Taoism 
 Ba Gua
 Ba Xian
 Ba Duan Jin

Other 
 In Wicca, there are eight Sabbats, festivals, seasons, or spokes in the Wheel of the Year.
 In Ancient Egyptian mythology, the Ogdoad represents the eight primordial deities of creation.
 In Scientology there are eight dynamics of existence.
 There is also the Ogdoad in Gnosticism.

As a lucky number
 The number eight is considered to be a lucky number in Chinese and other Asian cultures. Eight (accounting ; pinyin bā) is considered a lucky number in Chinese culture because it sounds like the word meaning to generate wealth (Pinyin: fā). Property with the number 8 may be valued greatly by Chinese. For example, a Hong Kong number plate with the number 8 was sold for $640,000. The opening ceremony of the Summer Olympics in Beijing started at 8 seconds and 8 minutes past 8 pm (local time) on 8 August 2008.
 In Pythagorean numerology (a pseudoscience) the number 8 represents victory, prosperity and overcoming.
  is also considered a lucky number in Japan, but the reason is different from that in Chinese culture. Eight gives an idea of growing prosperous, because the letter broadens gradually.
 In numerology, 8 is the number of building, and in some theories, also the number of destruction.

In astrology 
 In astrology, Scorpio is the 8th astrological sign of the Zodiac.
 In the Middle Ages, 8 was the number of "unmoving" stars in the sky, and symbolized the perfection of incoming planetary energy.

In music and dance 
 A note played for one-eighth the duration of a whole note is called an eighth note, or quaver.
 An octave, the interval between two musical notes with the same letter name (where one has double the frequency of the other), is so called because there are eight notes between the two on a standard major or minor diatonic scale, including the notes themselves and without chromatic deviation. The ecclesiastical modes are ascending diatonic musical scales of eight notes or tones comprising an octave.
 There are eight notes in the octatonic scale.
 There are eight musicians in a double quartet or an octet. Both terms may also refer to a musical composition for eight voices or instruments.
 Caledonians is a square dance for eight, resembling the quadrille.
 Albums with the number eight in their title include 8 by the Swedish band Arvingarna, 8 by the American rock band Incubus, The Meaning of 8 by Minnesota indie rock band Cloud Cult and 8ight by Anglo-American singer-songwriter Beatie Wolfe.
 Dream Theater's eighth album Octavarium contains many different references to the number 8, including the number of songs and various aspects of the music and cover artwork.
 "Eight maids a-milking" is the gift on the eighth day of Christmas in the carol "The Twelve Days of Christmas".
 The 8-track cartridge is a musical recording format.
 "#8" is the stage name of Slipknot vocalist Corey Taylor.
 "Too Many Eights" is a song by Athens, Georgia's Supercluster.
 Eight Seconds, a Canadian musical group popular in the 1980s with their most notable song "Kiss You (When It's Dangerous)".
 "Eight Days a Week" is a #1 single for the music group The Beatles.
 Figure 8 is the fifth studio album by singer-songwriter Elliott Smith, released in the year 2000, an album released by Julia Darling in 1999, and an album released by Outasight in 2011.
 Ming Hao from the k-pop group Seventeen goes by the name "The8".
 "8 (circle)" is the eighth song on the album 22, A Million by the American band Bon Iver.
 "8" is the eighth song on the album When We All Fall Asleep, Where Do We Go? by Billie Eilish.

In film and television 
 8 Guys is a 2003 short film written and directed by Dane Cook.
 8 Man (or Eightman): 1963 Japanese manga and anime superhero.
 8 Mile is a 2002 film directed by Curtis Hanson.
 8 mm is a 1999 film directed by Joel Schumacher.
 8 Women is a 2001 film directed by François Ozon.
 Eight Below is a 2006 film directed by Frank Marshall.
 Eight Legged Freaks is a 2002 film directed by Ellory Elkayem.
 Eight Men Out is a 1988 film directed by John Sayles.
 Jennifer Eight, also known as Jennifer 8, is a 1992 film written and directed by Bruce Robinson.
 Eight Is Enough is an American television comedy-drama series.
 In Stargate SG-1 and Stargate Atlantis, dialing an 8-chevron address will open a wormhole to another galaxy.
 The Hateful Eight is a 2015 American western mystery film written and directed by Quentin Tarantino.
 Kate Plus 8 is an American reality television show.
 Ocean's 8 is an American heist comedy film directed by Gary Ross.

In sports and other games 

 Eight-ball pool is played with a cue ball and 15 numbered balls, the black ball numbered 8 being the middle and most important one, as the winner is the player or side that legally pockets it after first pocketing its numerical group of 7 object balls (for other meanings see Eight ball (disambiguation)).
 In chess, each side has eight pawns and the board is made of 64 squares arranged in an eight by eight lattice. The eight queens puzzle is a challenge to arrange eight queens on the board so that none can capture any of the others.
 In the game of eights or Crazy Eights, each successive player must play a card either of the same suit or of the same rank as that played by the preceding player, or may play an eight and call for any suit. The object is to get rid of all one's cards first.
 In association football, the number 8 has historically been the number of the Central Midfielder.
 In Australian rules football, the top eight teams at the end of the Australian Football League regular season qualify for the finals series (i.e. playoffs).
 In baseball:
 The center fielder is designated as number 8 for scorekeeping purposes.
 The Men's College World Series, the final phase of the NCAA Division I tournament, features eight teams.
 In rugby union, the only position without a proper name is the Number 8, a forward position.
 In rugby league:
 Most competitions (though not the Super League, which uses static squad numbering) use a position-based player numbering system in which one of the two starting props wears the number 8.
 The Australia-based National Rugby League has its own 8-team finals series, similar but not identical in structure to that of the Australian Football League.
 In rowing, an "eight" refers to a sweep-oar racing boat with a crew of eight rowers plus a coxswain.
 In the 2008 Games of the XXIX Olympiad held in Beijing, the official opening was on 08/08/08 at 8:08:08 p.m. CST.
 In rock climbing, climbers frequently use the figure-eight knot to tie into their harnesses.
 The Women's College World Series, the final phase of the NCAA Division I softball tournament, like its men's counterpart in baseball, features eight teams.
 In curling an 8 point 'Eight Ender' is a perfect end.  Each team delivers 8 Stones per end.

In foods 
 Nestlé sells a brand of chocolates filled with peppermint-flavoured cream called After Eight, referring to the time 8 p.m.
 There are eight vegetables in V8 juice.

In literature 
 Eights may refer to octosyllabic, usually iambic, lines of verse.
 The drott-kvaett, an Old Icelandic verse, consisted of a stanza of eight regular lines.
 In Terry Pratchett's Discworld series, eight is a magical number and is considered taboo. Eight is not safe to be said by wizards on the Discworld and is the number of Bel-Shamharoth. Also, there are eight days in a Disc week and eight colours in a Disc spectrum, the eighth one being octarine.
 Lewis Carroll's poem The Hunting of the Snark has 8 "fits" (cantos), which is noted in the full name "The Hunting of the Snark – An Agony, in Eight Fits".
 Eight apparitions appear to Macbeth in Act 4 scene 1 of Shakespeare's Macbeth as representations of the eight descendants of Banquo.

In slang 
 An "eighth" is a common measurement of marijuana, meaning an eighth of an ounce. It is also a common unit of sale for psilocybin mushrooms.
 Avril Lavigne's song "Sk8er Boi" uses this convention in the title.
 "Section 8" is common U.S. slang for "crazy", based on the U.S. military's Section 8 discharge for mentally unfit personnel.
 The Housing Choice Voucher Program, operated by the United States Department of Housing and Urban Development, is commonly referred to as the Section 8 program, as this was the original section of the Act which instituted the program.
 In Colombia and Venezuela, "volverse un ocho" (meaning to tie oneself in a figure 8) refers to getting in trouble or contradicting oneself.
 In China, "8" is used in chat speak as a term for parting. This is due to the closeness in pronunciation of "8" (bā) and the English word "bye".

Other uses

 A figure 8 is the common name of a geometric shape, often used in the context of sports, such as skating. Figure-eight turns of a rope or cable around a cleat, pin, or bitt are used to belay something.

See also 
 The Magical Number Seven, Plus or Minus Two
List of highways numbered 8

References

External links 
 The Octonions, John C. Baez

Integers
8 (number)